Stephen Cavanna Headley (born 5 August 1943 in Bryn Mawr, Pennsylvania) is a social anthropologist and a priest of the Eastern Orthodox Church. He is best known for his books on the anthropology of prayer and the ethnography of Central Java in Indonesia. He writes in French and English.

Headley was married to the American artist Anne Everett who died in 2013.

Education and academic posts
Headley earned a B.A. degree in Oriental studies (Chinese and Sanskrit) from Columbia College, Columbia University in 1956 where he studied under Anton Zigmund-Cerbu. He obtained an M.A. degree in Buddhist studies from Columbia University in 1969 and continued his studies in Paris with a diploma in Sanskrit philology at the Ecole Pratique des Hautes Etudes (1972) and a doctorate in social anthropology under Georges Condominas at the Sorbonne in 1979. He also studied theology at Saint Vladimir's Orthodox Theological Seminary (Crestwood, New York, 1966–1969) and at the St Sergius Institute of Orthodox Theology in Paris (1969–1973).

He worked at the French National Center for Scientific Research between 1981 and 2008: between 1998 and 2008 he was working with a research team founded by the anthropologist Louis Dumont.

Between 1973 and 2005 Headley repeatedly did fieldwork in central Java, primarily in and around the village of Krendowahono.

Between 2006 and 2010 he taught in Moscow and undertook field work on parish life.

Publications

Books
 River of Rituals. An Anthropology of Alternative Rites. Volos Aademny, Greece, 2021.
 The Songs of The Bridal Chamber: Monks at Prayer. Volos Academy, Greece, 2020.
 After Secularization, Religious Faith in Modern Europe, Russia and Asia. St. Sebastian Press, Los Angeles,  2020.
 Du Désert et du Paradis. Introduction à la Théologie Ascétique. Paris: Editions du Cerf. 2018
 The Hidden Ear of God. A Christian Anthropology of Verbal Icons and Iconic Words. New York: Angelico Press. 2018.  
 Christ after Communism: Spiritual Authority and it Transmission in Three Parishes in Moscow. Orthodox Research Institute, Rollingsford. 2010.
 Durga’s Mosque : Cosmology, Conversion and Community in central Javanese Islam. Institute of South East Asian Studies, Singapore. 2004. Durga's Mosque was labeled a 2006 Outstanding Academic Title by the Association of College and Research Libraries, American Library Association.  
Review, Indonesia. no. 80, (2005): 197-202
Review Homme
 From Cosmogony to Exorcism in a Javanese Genesis. The Spilt Seed. Oxford Studies in Social and Cultural Anthropology, Oxford University Press. 2000.
 Review, American Anthropologist, Dec., 2002, vol. 104, no. 4, p. 1242
Review, Journal of Asian Studies, Aug., 2004, vol. 63, no. 3, p. 847-849

Edited volume
 Stephen C. Headley (ed) Moitiés d’hommes: thematic issue of the review l’Homme (Issue 174, April–June, 2005). Contains two chapters by Headley.
 Stephen C. Headley et David Parkin (eds), Islamic Prayer across the Indian Ocean. Inside and Outside the Mosque. 2000. Curzon Press, United Kingdom. 
 Stephen C. Headley (ed), Vers une anthropologie de la prière.  Etudes ethnolinguistiques javanaises. 1996. Publications Universitaires de Provence, Aix-en-Provence. Contains three chapters by Headley.
Review, Journal of Asian Studies, Nov 1997, vol. 56, no. 4, p. 1165-1167
 Stephen C. Headley (ed), Anthropologie de la prière : rites oraux en Asie du Sud-Est. Thematic issue of the review L’Homme.  Issue 132, vol. XXIV, Oct-Dec, 1994.

Published lectures
 Stephen C. Headley. 2016. "Liturgically Mediated Plurality.Transformative Contemplation in St . Basil’s Eucharistic canon and in St Maximus' Mystagogy". pp. 401–22 in Seeing Through the Eyes of Faith : New Approaches to the Mystagogy of the Church Fathers, edited by P.J.J. van Geest. Mystagogy Brill: Lieden.
 Stephen C. Headley. 2016. "Secularization or Normalization of Religion in Indonesia". pp. 323–36 in Parts and Whole, edited by L. Prager, M. Prager and M. Sprenger. LIT, Zurich 2016.
 Stephen C. Headley, "Unfinished" Secularization meets traditional hierarchies of values" in Indonesia and India". 2016. pp. 265–86 in Puissance et impuissance de la valeur: L’anthropologie comparative de Louis Dumont, edited by C. Barraud, A. Iteanu and I. Moya. Paris: CNRS Editions.

2010. “'If All Things Were Equal, Nothing would Exist': From Cosmos to Hierarchy in Dionysios the Areopagaite (6th Century) and Maximos the Confessor (580-662).” pp. 283–316 in La coherence des societies. Mélanges en homage à Daniel de Coppet, edited by A. Itéanu.  Paris: Fondation de la Maison des sciences de l’Homme.

 Stephen C. Headley. 2005. "Ebauches d’hommes, sociétés et corps inachevés", in L’Homme Special Edition "Les Moitiés d’Homme"  174:23-44.
 Stephen C. Headley. 1995. "Du temps de la prière à l’espace de croyance". pp. 437–44 in Ville, Espace et Valeurs, edited by J-L. Gourdon, E. Perrin and A.Tarrus.  Paris: L’Harmattan.
 Stephen C. Headley. 2005. "Des hommes incomplets à Java : engendrement, nourritures et assemblages", in L’Homme Special Edition "Les Moitiés d’Homme" 174:161-202.
 Stephen C. Headley. 2004. "The Javanese wuku weeks: Icons of good and bad time". pp. 211–236 in Poids et Mesures en Asie du Sud-Est, edited by P. Le Roux, B. Sellato and J. Ivanoff. Paris: Etudes Thématiques EFEO, IRSEA, Vol. I.
 Stephen C. Headley. 2003. "The Purification of Rice Fields in Java with an Apotropaic Plank". pp. 101–18 in The Art of Rice: Spirit and Sustenance in Asia, edited by R.W. Hamilton. Los Angeles: UCLA Fowler Museum of Cultural History.
 Stephen C. Headley. "Djihad i Obshina (Jihad and Community).” Stranishii 7(4):615-24.
 Stephen C. Headley. 2002. "Of Sacred Wells and Shopping Malls : Glimpses of the Reconstruction of Social Confidence in Solo after Soeharto". pp. 227–41 in Puppet Theater in Contemporary Indonesia: New Approaches to Performance-Events, edited by J. Mrazek. Ann Arbor: University of Michigan Press.
 Stephen C. Headley. 2002. "Nier Allah? Réflexions javanaises sur la conversion à l’Islam". pp. 393–404 in Nier les Dieux, Nier Dieu, edited by G. Dorival et D. Pralon. Aix-en-Provence: Publications Universitaires de Provence.
 Stephen C. Headley. 2000. "Sembah/Salat. The Javanisation of Islamic Prayer; the Islamisation of Javanese prayer". pp. 169–212 in Islamic Prayer Across the Indian Ocean. Inside and Outside the Mosque, edited by S.C. Headley and D. Parkin. London: Curzon Press.
 Stephen C. Headley. 2000. "Afterword: The Mirror in the Mosque". pp. 213–39 in Islamic Prayer Across the Indian Ocean. Inside and Outside the Mosque, edited by S.C. Headley and D. Parkin. London: Curzon Press.
 Stephen C. Headley. 2000. "Javanese Cosmogonies and Muslim Cosmographies: An Encomiastique Knowledge". Indonesia and the Malay World 28(82):280-300.
 Stephen C. Headley. 1997. "The Islamisation of Central Java : The Role of Muslim Lineages in Kalisoso". Studia Islamika  4(2):52-82.
 Stephen C. Headley. 1996. "Notes sur les Types de Soignants à Java". pp. 225–50 in Soigner au Pluriel,  edited by J. Benoit. Paris: L’Harmattan.
 Stephen C. Headley. 1991. "The Javanese Exorcisms of Evil : Betwixt India and Java". pp. 73–110 in The Art and Culture of South-East Asia, edited by L. Chandra. Delhi: Aditya Prakashan.
 Stephen C. Headley. 1987. "The Idiom of Siblingship". pp. 209–17 in De la Hutte au Palais Sociétés "à maison" en Asie du sud-est insulaire, edited by C. Macdonald. Paris: Editions du CNRS..
 Stephen C. Headley. 1987. "The Body as a House in Javanese Society". pp. 133–52 in De la Hutte au Palais Sociétés "à maison" en Asie du sud-est insulaire, edited by C. Macdonald. Paris: Editions du CNRS.
 Stephen C. Headley. 1987. "Of Icons and Wayang: Reading Notes on the Pragmatics of Spoken Prayer". Ecase/CNRS, Lettre d’Information 13:15-20.
 Stephen C. Headley. 1985. "Les Mythes de Java aujourd’hui l’imagination de l’inceste". Asie du Sud-Est et Monde Insulindien 16(1-2):157-172.
 Stephen C. Headley. 1984. "Indonésie Java, Bali, Sumatra".  pp. 195–207 in Encyclopédie des Mythes et des Croyances du Monde Entier edited by A. Akoum. Paris:Editions Lidis Brepols.
 Stephen C. Headley. "Le lit-grenier et la déesse de la fécondité, rites nuptiaux?”  Dialogue, le Lit 82:77-86.
 Stephen C. Headley. 1980. "Work in Indonesia and Malaysia: A Word and Its Culture".  Euro-Asia Center, Briefing Paper No.1, Insead, Fontainebleau.
 Stephen C. Headley. 1980. "The Partner of Foreign Investors in Indonesia: The Tip of the Ethnic Iceberg". Euro-Asia Center, Briefing Paper No.2, Insead.
 Stephen C. Headley. 1980. "The Cultural Dimensions of Indonesian Management". Euro-Asia Center, Briefing Paper No.5, Insead.
 Stephen C. Headley. 1980. "Personnel Management in Indonesia: How?” Euro-Asia Center, Briefing Paper No.4, Insead.
 Stephen C. Headley. 1980. "Forward to Government-Business Relations in Indonesia". Euro-Asia Center, Briefing Paper No.3, Insead.
 Stephen C. Headley. 1980. "Recyclage Rituel au Centre de Java: le 'Relancement' du Buffle de Durga". Asie du Sud-Est et Monde Insulindien 11(1-4):401-13.
 Stephen C. Headley. 1980. "De l’Apanage au Métayage, l’exemple de Java central". pp. 111–24 in Sociétés Paysannes du Tiers-Monde edited by C. Coquery-Vidrovitch. Lille: Presses Universitaire de Lille.
 Stephen C. Headley. 1979. "The Ritual lancing of Durga’s Buffalo in Surakarta and the Offering in the Krendowahono Forest of its Blood". pp. 49–58 in Between People and Statistics. Essays on Modern Indonesian History presented to P. Creutsberg, edited by F. Van Anrooij, D.H.A. Kolff, J.T.M. Van Laanen and G.J. Telkamp. The Hague: Martinus Nijhoff.
 Stephen C. Headley. 1976. "Le Hameau de Krendawahana : Rapport de Mission en Java Central sur la Transformation des Logiques Sociales". l’Asie du Sud-Est et le Monde Insulindien, 7(1):101-30.
 Stephen C. Headley. 1973-74. "Prajñopayaviniscayasiddhi » (Extraits de Positions de Mémoire).” L’Annuaire de l’Ecole Pratique des Hautes Etudes4( 1973–74):787-89.

References

1943 births
Living people
People from Bryn Mawr, Pennsylvania
American anthropologists
American Eastern Orthodox priests
Eastern Orthodox priests in the United States
Javanists
20th-century Eastern Orthodox Christians
21st-century Eastern Orthodox priests
Columbia College (New York) alumni
21st-century American clergy